Lee Jones (born 21 February 1975 in Castor Bay) is an association football player who has represented New Zealand at international level.

Career

Jones made 5 appearances for the New Zealand national football team, the All Whites, his debut coming in a 9–1 win over Papua New Guinea on 7 July 2002.

In 1994, he won the New Zealand championship with North Shore United.

References 

1975 births
Living people
New Zealand association footballers
New Zealand expatriate association footballers
New Zealand international footballers
Sportspeople from the Auckland Region
Akron Zips men's soccer players
East Coast Bays AFC players
Wimbledon F.C. players
Football Kingz F.C. players
Tampere United players
FC Jokerit players
Veikkausliiga players
Drogheda United F.C. players
League of Ireland players
2002 OFC Nations Cup players
Association football defenders
Association footballers from Auckland
Expatriate footballers in Finland
Expatriate association footballers in the Republic of Ireland
New Zealand expatriate sportspeople in Finland
New Zealand expatriate sportspeople in Ireland